Jungle Gents is a 1954 American comedy film directed by Edward Bernds and starring The Bowery Boys. The film was released on September 5, 1954 by Allied Artists and is the thirty-fifth film in the series and the film debut of Clint Walker in an uncredited appearance at the end of the film.

Plot
Sach obtains the ability to smell diamonds after he starts taking medication for a sinus infection.  He and the boys go off to Africa in search of wealth, with Grimshaw as their guide.  A gang of thieves comes along and tries to steal any diamonds that they may find.  They capture the boys and insist they help the thieves find diamonds.  The boys are unwilling to help so they try to get Sach to catch a cold so he cannot smell any diamonds.  Unfortunately the thieves enlist a witch doctor to cure Sach.  A native jungle girl, Anatta, who only wants a "kiss, kiss, kiss" from Sach, comes along and rescues them.

Cast

The Bowery Boys
Leo Gorcey as Terrance Aloysius 'Slip' Mahoney
Huntz Hall as Horace Debussy 'Sach' Jones
David Gorcey as Chuck Anderson (Credited as David Condon)
Bennie Bartlett as Butch Williams

Remaining cast
Bernard Gorcey as Louie Dumbrowski
Patrick O'Moore as Grimshaw
Rudolph Anders as Dr. Goebel
Laurette Luez as Anatta
Clint Walker (as Anatta's mate)
Emory Parnell as Police Capt. Daly

Production
The jungle sets are the same ones used for the 1949-1955 film series starring Bomba, the Jungle Boy.

Home media
Warner Archives released the film on made-to-order DVD in the United States as part of "The Bowery Boys, Volume Four" on August 26, 2014.

References

External links

1954 comedy films
1954 films
American black-and-white films
American comedy films
Bowery Boys films
Allied Artists films
1950s English-language films
Films directed by Edward Bernds
1950s American films